John McNamara or Macnamara may refer to:

Politics
John Macnamara (MP), MP for Leicester in the 1780s
John McNamara (Australian politician) (fl. 1850s), New South Wales politician
John Macnamara (1905–1944), British Army officer and politician
John McNamara, mayor of Rockford, Illinois (1981–89)

Sports
John J. McNamara (author) (1932–1986), banker, author and Olympic sailor
John McNamara (baseball) (1932–2020), American baseball manager
Jackie McNamara Sr. (born 1952), Scottish footballer
Jackie McNamara (born 1973), Scottish footballer
JT McNamara (1975–2016), Irish steeplechase jockey

Others
John J. McNamara (1876–1941), one of the McNamara brothers who bombed the office of the Los Angeles Times in 1910
John Michael McNamara (1878–1960), American clergyman of the Roman Catholic Church
John McNamara (VC) (1887–1918), recipient of the Victoria Cross
John J. McNamara (architect) (fl. 1930s–1960s), American theater architect
John Leo McNamara (1922–2004), Australian bushman, poet, historian and author
John R. McNamara (1927–2001), U.S. Navy officer and Catholic bishop
John McNamara (artist) (born 1950), American artist
John McNamara (sportswriter) (1961/2–2018), sports reporter killed in the Capital Gazette shooting
John McNamara (writer) (born 1962), co-creator of Profit
John McNamara (fraudster) (fl. 1980s–1990s), Long-Island car dealer convicted of defrauding GMAC
John McNamara (mathematical biologist), English mathematical biologist